The Renault Scala nameplate has been used by the French automobile manufacturer Renault for the following cars, in the following markets:

 Renault Samsung SM3, in Mexico, Egypt, Cuba and Colombia from 2010–2013
 Nissan Almera (also as Latio, Sunny and Versa), in India from 2012–2017
 Renault Mégane, in Iran from 2013–2016

Scala